Allan Forsyth (born 23 April 1955, in Glasgow) is a Scottish former footballer who played as a defender.

Career
Forsyth began his professional career with Dundee United and made nearly thirty league appearances for The Terrors over a four-year spell. In 1978, Forsyth became Raith Rovers' record signing in a £12,000 deal and played in over 150 league games for Rovers before moving to Dunfermline Athletic in 1984. His final professional spell brought nearly 40 league matches before moving to junior football in 1985 with Glenrothes. After retiring from playing, Forsyth had a spell in management with Thornton Hibs before leaving football to work in a furniture factory in Kirkcaldy.

References

External links
 

1955 births
Living people
Scottish footballers
Sportspeople from Rutherglen
Dundee United F.C. players
Raith Rovers F.C. players
Dunfermline Athletic F.C. players
Larkhall Thistle F.C. players
Scottish Football League players
Association football defenders
Footballers from Glasgow
Scottish Junior Football Association players
Scottish football managers
Glenrothes F.C. players
Footballers from South Lanarkshire